Friedersdorf is a former municipality in the district Löbau-Zittau, in Saxony, Germany. Since January 2008, it is part of the town Neusalza-Spremberg.

Former municipalities in Saxony
Populated places in Görlitz (district)